Acrotylus is a genus of grasshopper in the family Acrididae and the type genus of the tribe Acrotylini.

Species 
Acrotylus containing the following species:

Acrotylus aberrans Bruner, 1910 - Madagascar
Acrotylus angulatus Stål, 1876
Acrotylus apicalis Bolívar, 1908
Acrotylus apricarius Stål, 1873
Acrotylus azureus Uvarov, 1929
Acrotylus bicornis Sjöstedt, 1918
Acrotylus bilobatus Miller, 1932
Acrotylus blondeli Saussure, 1884 Sahel through to Yemen; southeast Africa
Acrotylus braudi Defaut, 2005
Acrotylus cabaceira Brancsik, 1893
Acrotylus capitatus Kirby, 1902
Acrotylus concinnus Serville, 1838
Acrotylus crassiceps Uvarov, 1953
Acrotylus crassus Saussure, 1884
Acrotylus daveyi Mason, 1959
Acrotylus deustus Thunberg, 1815
Acrotylus diana Karny, 1910
Acrotylus elgonensis Sjöstedt, 1933
Acrotylus errabundus Finot, 1893
Acrotylus fischeri Azam, 1901
Acrotylus flavescens Stål, 1873
Acrotylus fulgens Uvarov, 1953
Acrotylus furcifer Saussure, 1888
Acrotylus gracilis La Greca, 1991
Acrotylus hirtus Dirsh, 1956
Acrotylus hottentotus Saussure, 1884
Acrotylus humbertianus Saussure, 1884 - India
Acrotylus incarnatus Krauss, 1907
Acrotylus innotatus Uvarov, 1933
Acrotylus inornatus Kuthy, 1905
Acrotylus insubricus Scopoli, 1786
Acrotylus johnstoni Kirby, 1902
Acrotylus junodi Schulthess Schindler, 1899
Acrotylus kirbyi Froggatt, 1903
Acrotylus knipperi Kevan, 1961
Acrotylus longipes Charpentier, 1845
Acrotylus meruensis Sjöstedt, 1932
Acrotylus mossambicus Brancsik, 1893
Acrotylus multispinosus Brancsik, 1893 - Madagascar
Acrotylus ndoloi Kevan, 1956
Acrotylus nigripennis Uvarov, 1922
Acrotylus ocellatus Brancsik, 1893
Acrotylus patruelis Herrich-Schäffer, 1838
Acrotylus ponomarenkoi Storozhenko, 1992 - Vietnam
Acrotylus somaliensis Johnsen & Schmidt, 1982
Acrotylus trifasciatus Kevan, 1961
Acrotylus trigrammus Bolívar, 1912

References 

Acrididae genera
Oedipodinae